Paul N. Saleh (born 1957), is an American business executive who is currently president and chief executive officer for Gainwell Technologies. Mr. Saleh is currently a board member of Anterix. Mr Saleh also served as board member of Citadel Broadcasting Corporation, American Football Coaches Foundation  and Perspecta Inc.  In May 2012 Mr. Saleh was named CSC's Chief Financial Officer (which became DXC Technology in 2017).  In November 2010 Mr. Saleh was named Gannett's Chief Financial Officer. Mr. Saleh served as the chief financial officer (CFO) and executive vice president for Nextel Communications. He later served as interim chief executive officer (CEO) of Sprint Nextel Corporation in late 2007 and as the company's CFO from 2001 to 2008.

Education and personal life
Saleh holds B.S. and M.S. degrees in electrical engineering, as well as an M.B.A., from the University of Michigan's Ross School of Business.

Career
Before joining Nextel, Saleh served as senior vice president and treasurer for The Walt Disney Company from 1997 to 1999, and later became chief financial officer of Walt Disney International.  Prior to Disney, he served as treasurer of Honeywell, where he spent 12 years in various leadership positions in finance, treasury, investor relations, strategic planning and operations.  He served as executive vice president and CFO of Nextel Communications from September 2001 to August 2005, and he was appointed CFO of the combined company after Nextel's merger with Sprint.  On October 8, 2007, he became the acting CEO of Sprint Nextel following Gary Forsee's resignation.

Recognition
Institutional Investor Magazine named Saleh as the Best CFO in the telecom services wireless sector in 2004, 2005, 2006 and 2007. In June 2005, Treasury & Risk Management magazine included him among its list of the 100 Most Influential People in Finance. In 2003 and 2006, he received the Public Company CFO of the Year Award at the Greater Washington Technology CFO Awards.

References 

1957 births
Living people
Ross School of Business alumni
American chief financial officers
American chief executives
University of Michigan College of Engineering alumni